The American Journal of Respiratory Cell and Molecular Biology is a monthly peer-reviewed medical journal and an official publication of the American Thoracic Society. It covers research on the structure and function of the respiratory system under physiologic and pathophysiologic conditions. It was established in July 1989. The founding editors-in-chief were Jerome S. Brody, Robert M. Senior, and Mary C. Williams. John A. Mcdonald served as editor from 1993 to 1998. Kenneth B. Adler (North Carolina State University) served as editor from 2009-2016. Paul Schumacker (Northwestern University) assumed the editorship on October 1, 2016.

Abstracting and indexing
The journal is abstracted and indexed in BIOSIS Previews, Current Contents/Life Sciences, Current Contents/Critical Care Medicine, Embase, Index Medicus/MEDLINE/PubMed, Science Citation Index Expanded, and Scopus. According to the Journal Citation Reports, the journal has a 2021 impact factor of 7.748.

References

External links

Publications established in 1989
Pulmonology journals
Monthly journals
English-language journals
Academic journals published by learned and professional societies of the United States